Dimla is an upazila of Nilphamari District in the Rangpur Rangpur Division, Bangladesh.

Geography
It has 36, 440 households and a total area of 326.8 km2.
It is bordered by West Bengal,  India on the north and Jaldhaka Upazila on the south.

Demographics
Par the 2001 Bangladesh census, Dimla had a population of 223975; male 114453, female 109522; Muslim 198399, Hindu 25483, Buddhist 13 and others 80.

According to the  1991 Bangladesh census, Dimla had a population of 187,696. Males constituted 51.24% of the population, and females 48.76%. Dimla had an average literacy rate of 19.4% (7+ years), against  the national average of 32.4%.

Administration
Dimla thana, now an upazila, was established in 1857.

Dimla Upazila is divided into ten union parishads: Balapara, Dimla, Jhunagachh Chapani, Khalisha Chapani, Khogakharibari, Naotara, Paschim Chhatnay, Purba Chhatnay, and Tepakhribari. The union parishads are subdivided into 53 mauzas and 53 villages.

Chairman : Md. Tabibul Islam 
                   
Women Vice Chairman : Mst. Ayesa Siddika

Vice Chairman : Md. Muzibur Rahman

Upazila Nirbahi Officer (UNO):  Md. Rezaul Korim

Education
 Jatua Khata B.L High School
 Balapara B.L High School
Dimla Islamia Degree College
 Dimla Polytechnic Institut
 Dimla Mohila College
 Dimla Textile Institute
 Dimla Technical and Business Management Institute
 Dimla R.B.R. Govt. High School
 Dimla Govt. Girls' High School
 Sundarkhata Shafiqul Goni Shapon Fazil Madrasa
 Shalhati B.L. High School
 Satjan High School
 Satjan Dhakil Madrasa
 Khalisha Chapani Bebari Tala Alim Madrasha
 Sonakhuli Hajee Jaharatulla High School
 Shaheed Ziaur Rahman Degree College
 Jhunagach Chapani Girls' High School
 Khagakhaibari Technical and Business Management Institute
 Janata College
 Doholpara Adarsho School & College
 Doholpara Janata Alim Madrasha
 Khaga Kharibari High School 
 Khaga Barobari Girls' School
 Dimla Mohila B.M College
 Chhatnai High School
 Chhatnai Women's College
 Dimla Adarsha High School

Notable People
 Mashiur Rahman Jadu Mia, former Senior Minister with the rank and status of Prime Minister.
 Shawfikul Ghaani Shawpan, former Minister of Housing and Public Works.
 Jebel Rahman Ghaani, politician and chairman of Bangladesh National Awami Party-Bangladesh NAP

See also
Upazilas of Bangladesh
Districts of Bangladesh
Divisions of Bangladesh

References

 
Upazilas of Nilphamari District